Hidden Christian Sites in the Nagasaki Region is a group of twelve sites in Nagasaki Prefecture and Kumamoto Prefecture relating to the history of Christianity in Japan. The Nagasaki churches are unique in the sense that each tells a story about the revival of Christianity after a long period of official suppression.

Proposed jointly in 2007 for inscription on the UNESCO World Heritage List under criteria ii, iii, iv, v, and vi, the submission named at the time Churches and Christian Sites in Nagasaki on the Tentative List, was recognized on January 30, 2018, as a World Heritage Site.

The initial nomination included 26 sites; however, after reconsideration the Nagasaki Prefecture reduced the monuments to 13 sites. Twelve sites were recognized. Concerns over the Hidden Christian Sites in the Nagasaki Region have been widely discussed in the academic literature.

Christianity in Japan

Christianity arrived in Japan in 1549 with the Jesuit missionary Francis Xavier. Fanning out from Nagasaki, the new faith won many converts, including a number of daimyōs. Toyotomi Hideyoshi then Tokugawa Ieyasu persecuted those professing to be Christian. After the Shimabara Rebellion of 1637–1638, the official suppression of Christian practices was combined with a policy of national seclusion that lasted over two centuries. With the advent of Western powers and reopening of Japan in the 1850s and the reforms of the Meiji Restoration, missionary activity was renewed and a number of Hidden Christians resurfaced. Ōura Cathedral of 1864 is the first of the churches built in subsequent years.

On 30 June 2018, thanking the UNESCO for the admission in the World Heritage List, the then Prime Minister Shinzo Abe publicly declared that the Hidden Christian Sites "convey the 'shape' of a faith that is unique to Japan and they are truly unparalleled worldwide as heritage of humankind."

Monuments

Previous Nominated Monuments
The list consists of sites previously nominated, but currently not in the list.

See also
 Kirishitan
 Kakure Kirishitan
 Tenshō embassy
 Hasekura Tsunenaga
 Nagasaki Peace Park
 World Heritage Sites in Japan
 National Treasures of Japan

Notes

References

External links
  Candidate for World Heritage
  The Nagasaki Church Group
  Candidate for World Heritage
  The Nagasaki Church Group
  Outline of Churches and Christian Sites
  Map of proposed sites

Buildings and structures in Nagasaki
Culture in Nagasaki Prefecture
History of Christianity in Japan
Japanese culture
Religious buildings and structures in Nagasaki Prefecture
World Heritage Sites in Japan
Hidden Christian Sites in the Nagasaki Region